Potamanthidae is a family of mayflies with three genera in which there are 23 species.

Classification
Genus Anthopotamus
Anthopotamus distinctus (Traver, 1935)
Anthopotamus myops (Walsh, 1863)
Anthopotamus verticis (Say, 1839)
Anthopotamus neglectus (Traver, 1935)

Genus Potamanthus
Potamanthus formosus Eaton, 1892
Potamanthus huoshanensis Wu, 1987
Potamanthus idiocerus Bae & McCafferty, 1991
Potamanthus kwangsiensis (Hsu, 1937)
Potamanthus longitibius Bae & McCafferty, 1991
Potamanthus luteus (Linnaeus, 1767)
Potamanthus macrophthalmus (You, 1984)
Potamanthus nanchangi (Hsu, 1936)
Potamanthus sabahensis (Bae & McCafferty, 1990)
Potamanthus sangangensis (You, 1984)
Potamanthus subcostalis Navás, 1932
Potamanthus yooni Bae & McCafferty, 1991
Potamanthus yunnanensis (You, Wu, Gui & Hsu, 1982)

Genus Rhoenanthus
Rhoenanthus coreanus (Yoon & Bae, 1985)
Rhoenanthus distafurcus (Bae & McCafferty 1991)
Rhoenanthus magnificus (Ulmer 1920)
Rhoenanthus obscurus (Navás, 1922)
Rhoenanthus sapa (Nguyen & Bae, 2004)
Rhoenanthus speciosus (Eaton 1881)
Rhoenanthus youi (Wu & You, 1986)

Genus Stygifloris
Stygifloris sp. EP141

References

Mayflies
Insect families